Melaleuca spicigera is a plant in the myrtle family, Myrtaceae, and is endemic to the south-west of Western Australia. It has wavy, stem-clasping, blue-green leaves and spikes of pink flowers in spring.

Description
The leaves are of a blue-green colour, lack a stalk and are wavy or dished, only rarely flat.

The flowers are a shade of pink to purple and are arranged in short spikes on the sides of the branches. The stamens are arranged in five bundles around the flowers and there are 9 to 16 stamens per bundle.

Taxonomy and naming
Melaleuca spicigera was first formally described in 1902 by Spencer Le Marchant Moore in Journal of Botany from a specimen collected by James Drummond in 1843. The specific epithet (spicigera) is from a Latin word spīca meaning “ear of grain” in reference to the flowers being arranged in a spike.

Distribution and habitat
This melaleuca occurs in and between the Ongerup, Dowerin and Salmon Gums districts in the Avon Wheatbelt, Coolgardie, Esperance Plains and Mallee biogeographic regions. It grows in sandy, clayey or gravelly soils on undulating plains.

Conservation
Melaleuca spicigera is listed as "not threatened" by the Government of Western Australia Department of Parks and Wildlife.

Use in horticulture
This species is ornamental and hardy in cultivation in temperate regions, growing in well-drained soils in full sun or semi-shade. It is frost tolerant.

References

spigera
Myrtales of Australia
Plants described in 1902
Endemic flora of Western Australia